Mwata Bowden (born October 11, 1947 in Memphis, Tennessee, United States) is an American jazz reeds player associated with the Association for the Advancement of Creative Musicians and an instructor in improvisational Jazz at the University of Chicago.  He is part of a group known as 8 bold souls but also frequently engages in collaborations with Tatsu Aoki, and helped establish the Miyumi Project which was a blend of music with different ethnic backgrounds, highlighting contributions from Japanese taiko drumming in the framework of jazz music.

As part of his regular repertoire, Mr. Bowden plays a range of saxophones and clarinets (including the E-flat clarinet, B-flat clarinet, bass clarinet, contra-alto clarinet, and contrabass clarinet), as well as flute, zamada, and didgeridoo.

He teaches young aspiring musicians in the Chicago area.  Mwata has a son who performs "Disco Poetry" under the name Khari B.

External links
Mwata Bowden page at AACM site
Mwata Bowden page at University of Chicago Music Department site

Didgeridoo players
1947 births
Living people
Bass clarinetists
Musicians from Chicago
African-American jazz musicians
American jazz saxophonists
American male saxophonists
21st-century American saxophonists
Jazz musicians from Illinois
21st-century clarinetists
21st-century American male musicians
American male jazz musicians
21st-century African-American musicians
20th-century African-American people